The Takoradi-Old Accra Bus Station, in Ghana, was initially called Accra station. It was once very popular for its routes, taxis, and private car operations to Accra. The Old Accra station was moved to a larger facility to accommodate an increase in demand, hence the name change.

Buildings and structures in Accra